The 2019 Thoreau Tennis Open was a professional tennis tournament played on outdoor hard courts. It was the first edition of the tournament which was part of the 2019 ITF Women's World Tennis Tour. It took place in Concord, Massachusetts, United States between 12 and 17 August 2019.

Singles main-draw entrants

Seeds

 1 Rankings are as of 5 August 2019.

Other entrants
The following players received wildcards into the singles main draw:
  Brittany Collens
  Caroline Dolehide
  Elizabeth Halbauer
  Claire Liu

The following players received entry from the qualifying draw:
  Sophie Chang
  Magdalena Fręch
  Olga Govortsova
  Paula Ormaechea
  Nina Stojanović
  Fanny Stollár
  Sophia Whittle
  You Xiaodi

Champions

Singles

 Caroline Dolehide def.  Ann Li, 6–3, 7–5

Doubles

 Angela Kulikov /  Rianna Valdes def.  Elizabeth Halbauer /  Ingrid Neel, 7–6(7–3), 4–6, [17–15]

References

External links
 2019 Thoreau Tennis Open at ITFtennis.com
 Official website 

2019 ITF Women's World Tennis Tour
2019 in American tennis
Tennis in Massachusetts